The San Luis Rey River bike path is a bike path, for bicycle and pedestrian use, that follows the San Luis Rey River in Oceanside, northern San Diego County, California.

The  paved class one bike route is an easy and relatively flat and straight ride. Its entire length is separated from all vehicular transportation, except for 1 mile from the Easternmost Access Point at N Santa Fe Ave and Via Manos where cyclists and pedestrians will have to take Tyler St and Andrew Jackson St for 0.2 miles to continue on the San Luis Rey River Trail bike path, but besides that, there are no at-grade street crossings, traffic signals, or stop signs along it. The west end is close to the Oceanside Transit Center, enabling users to access it by rail. It passes parallel to the runway of Oceanside Municipal Airport. Before it was paved, the right of way was a rail line used by the United States Military to move cargo along the river. 

The trail can be used by pedestrians and bikers, but it does not permit electric bikes capable of more  than 20 mph, or equestrian use.

See also
 List of San Diego bike paths
 List of Los Angeles bike paths
 List of cycleways
 Rail trail

References
Efgh.com: San Diego and North County Red Routes website
Oceanside.ca.us: City of Oceanside website

Bike paths in San Diego
Oceanside, California
Tourist attractions in San Diego County, California